Timberlake Wertenbaker is a British-based playwright, screenplay writer, and translator who has written plays for the Royal Court, the Royal Shakespeare Company and others. She has been described in The Washington Post as "the doyenne of political theatre of the 1980s and 1990s".

Wertenbaker's best-known work is Our Country's Good, which received six Tony nominations for its 1991 production. She has a propensity to write about political thinking and conflict, especially where there is a settled orthodoxy: "Then the rebel in me goes berserk, and I start pawing at it. I like the area where the questions are, and the ambiguities of political life, rather than the certainties."

Background 

Wertenbaker was born in New York City to Charles Wertenbaker, a journalist, and Lael Wertenbaker, a writer. Much of her childhood was spent in the Basque Country in the small French fishing village of Ciboure.

She has been described as possessing a "characteristic reticence"; she has indicated that this may spring partly from her upbringing in Ciboure: "One thing they would tell you as a child was never to say anything because you might be betraying someone who had done something politically or whatever. So I was inculcated with this idea of emotional privacy."

Career
Wertenbaker was the resident writer for Shared Experience in 1983 and the Royal Court Theatre from 1984 to 1985. She was on the Executive Council of the English Stage Company from 1992 to 1997 and on the Executive Committee of PEN from 1998 to 2001. She served as the Royden B. Davis professor of Theatre at Georgetown University, Washington D.C., for 2005–06. She was the Leverhulme Artist in Residence at the Freud Museum in 2011. She was also the artistic director of New Perspective Theatre Company.

Currently, Wertenbaker is the Chair in Playwriting at  the University of East Anglia. In addition, she is artistic adviser to the Royal Academy of Dramatic Art and on the council of the Royal Society of Literature.

Themes
Central topics in her work are the efforts of individuals, particularly women: pursuing quests, seeking change, breaking boundaries, and constructing or challenging gender roles. A central technique is the revisioning of actual or imaginary lives from the past, sometimes remote in place as well as in time.

There is a further recurring theme in her work: displacement. In her plays, characters are often removed from the familiarity of home and are forced to live in new cultures, sometimes defined by national boundaries, other times by cultural and class divisions. From this central theme emerge related themes, including isolation, dispossession, and the problem of forging an identity within a new cultural milieu. In her work, individuals often seem to assume roles, as if identity were a matter of persons performing themselves. Wertenbaker's work also demonstrates a keen awareness that communication occurs through language that often inadequately expresses experience.

Personal life
Wertenbaker has a home in north London, where she lives with her husband, the writer John Man. The couple have one non-binary child, Dushka.

Legacy 
In 1997, the British Library acquired Wertenbaker's archive consisting of manuscripts, correspondence and papers relating to her writings.

Honours and awards 
 1985  Plays and Players Most Promising Playwright Award for The Grace of Mary Traverse
 1988  Evening Standard Award for Most Promising Playwright, Our Country's Good
 1988  Laurence Olivier/BBC Award for Best New Play, Our Country's Good
 1989  Eileen Anderson Central Television Drama Award for The Love of the Nightingale
 1989 Whiting Award for Drama
 1990  Drama Critics' Circle Award for Best New Foreign Play (New York), Our Country's Good
 1991  Critics' Circle Theatre Awards for Best West End Play (London), Three Birds Alighting on a Field
 1992  Susan Smith Blackburn Prize for Three Birds Alighting on a Field
 1992  Writers' Guild Award (Best West End Play) for Three Birds Alighting on a Field
 2016 Writers' Guild Award (Best New Play) for "Jefferson's Garden"

Wertenbaker was made a Fellow of the Royal Society of Literature in 2006.

Works

Plays
Wertenbaker has written plays for the Royal Court, the RSC and other  theatre companies:

 This Is No Place for Tallulah Bankhead (1978)
 The Third (1980)
 Second Sentence (1980)
 Case to Answer (1980)
 Breaking Through (1980)
 New Anatomies (1981)
 Inside Out (1982)
 Home Leave (1982)
 Abel’s Sister (1984)
 The Grace of Mary Traverse (1985)
 Our Country's Good (1988)
 The Love of the Nightingale (1989)
 Three Birds Alighting on a Field (1991)
 The Break of Day (1995)
 After Darwin (1998)
 Dianeira (radio, 1999)
 The Ash Girl (adaptation of "Cinderella", 2000)
 Credible Witness (2001)
 Galileo's Daughter (2004)
 Scenes of Seduction (radio, 2005)
 Divine Intervention (2006)
 Arden City (for the National Theatre Connections program, 2008)
 The Line (2009)
 Our Ajax (Southwark Playhouse, produced by Karl Sydow and Supporting Wall, 2013)
 The Ant and the Cicada (2014)
 Jefferson's Garden (2015)
 Winter Hill' (Octagon Theatre Bolton, 2017)
 Who Are You? (2021)

 Translations and adaptations 
Her translations and adaptations include several plays by Marivaux (Shared Experience, Radio 3), Sophocles’ Theban Plays (RSC), Euripides’ Hecuba (ACT, San Francisco), Eduardo de Filippo, Gabriela Preissová’s Jenůfa (Arcola), and Racine (Phèdre, Britannicus).

 Mephisto by Ariane Mnouchkine (1986)
 Léocadia by Jean Anouilh (1987)
 False Admissions; Successful Strategies; La Dispute: Three Plays by Marivaux (1989)
 The Thebans by Sophocles (1992)
 Filumena by Eduardo De Filippo (1998)
 Hecuba by Euripides (2001) (radio)
 Jenůfa by Gabriela Preissová (2007)
 Hippolytus by Euripides (2009)
 Phèdre by Jean Racine (2009)
 Elektra by Sophocles (2010 & 2012)
 Antigone by Sophocles (2011)
 Britannicus by Jean Racine (2011)
 Little brother. An odyssey to Europe by Ibrahima Balde and Amets Arzallus Antia (2019)

Radio
 What Is the Custom of Your Grief? (BBC Radio 4)
 The Memory of Gold (October 2012 for BBC Radio 3)
 Possession Fifteen part adaptation of A.S. Byatt's novel (Woman's Hour, BBC Radio 4)
 War and Peace a 10-hour adaptation of Tolstoy's novel (January 2015, BBC Radio 4)
  Adaptation of Elena Ferrante's Neapolitan Novels (2017, BBC Radio 4)
 In Search of Lost Time 10-hour adaptation of Marcel Proust's In Search of Lost Time (August 2019, BBC Radio 4)

Opera
 The Love of the Nightingale, music by Richard Mills (Perth International Arts Festival 2006, Sydney Opera House 2011)

Screenplays
 The Children (directed by Tony Palmer, adapted from Edith Wharton)
 Do Not Disturb Compilations 
 Plays, Vol. 1: New Anatomies; The Grace of Mary Traverse; Our Country's Good; The Love of the Nightingale; Three Birds Alighting on a Field (Faber and Faber)
 Plays, Vol. 2: The Break of Day; After Darwin; Credible Witness; The Ash Girl; Diianeira (Faber and Faber)

 References 

 External links 
 Mark Lawson, "Timberlake Wertenbaker: ‘You can’t get a straightforward history of America’", The Guardian'', 7 February 2015.
 Profile and Production History at The Whiting Foundation

1951 births
Living people
British dramatists and playwrights
Fellows of the Royal Society of Literature
British translators
French–English translators
Greek–English translators
Academics of the University of East Anglia
British women dramatists and playwrights
St. John's College (Annapolis/Santa Fe) alumni
British women writers